Chanthaphone Waenvongsoth (born 4 November 1994) is a Laotian footballer who plays as an attacking midfielder for Young Elephants FC and the national team. He made his first appearance for the Laos national football team in 2013.

References 

1994 births
Living people
Laotian footballers
Laos international footballers
Association football midfielders
People from Vientiane